Craig Mikel Wayans (born March 27, 1976) is an American writer, television producer and actor. He is the nephew of Keenen Ivory Wayans, Damon Wayans Sr., Kim Wayans, Shawn Wayans and Marlon Wayans.

Career
Craig was born in New York City, New York to Diedre Wayans, sister to Keenen Ivory Wayans, Damon Wayans, Sr., Kim Wayans, Shawn Wayans and Marlon Wayans. He worked as production assistant on his uncle Damon's film, Major Payne. He helped write the script for Scary Movie 2. He has also appeared in bit parts in Don't Be a Menace to South Central While Drinking Your Juice in the Hood (1996) and The Sixth Man (1997). He co-starred in Thugaboo: Miracle on D-Roc's Street (2006) and Dance Flick (2009). He was a regular writer and producer on Damon Wayans' TV sitcom My Wife And Kids, along with Damien Dante Wayans, and Kim Wayans. Craig co-created and co-starred in the 2013 BET TV show Second Generation Wayans with his cousin, Damien Dante Wayans.

Filmography

References

External links

American male screenwriters
Living people
Craig
1976 births
20th-century American male actors
21st-century American male actors
American television producers
American male film actors
20th-century African-American people
21st-century African-American people